Chonnabot is a district (amphoe) of Khon Kaen province, northeastern Thailand.

History
Mueang Chonbot (ชลบถ) was established at the beginning of the Rattanakosin era of around 1783. Its center was at Ban Nong Kong Kaeo. In 1914, it was converted to a district. In 1943 it was downgraded to be part of Ban Phai district. In 1966, the district was re-established, consisting of tambons Chonnabot, Kut Phia Khom, Ban Thaen, and Wang Saeng.

Geography

Neighboring districts are (from the north clockwise): Mancha Khiri, Ban Phai, Non Sila, Phon, Waeng Yai and Khok Pho Chai.

Economy
, Thai sugar giant, the Mitr Phol Group, plans to construct a sugarcane mill and biomass power plant in the district. The initiative will occupy  of three of the province's neighbouring districts: Chonnabot,  Ban Phai, and Non Sila. The operation will form part of the Ban Phai Bio-Hub Industrial Estate and is linked to the Eastern Economic Corridor (EEC) project. Mitr Phol's plans have been met with some opposition from local residents. Mitr Phol has pledged that the factory will have no adverse environmental effects.

Administration
The district is divided into eight subdistricts (tambons), which are further subdivided into 80 villages (mubans). Chonnabot is a township (thesaban tambon) which covers parts of tambons Chonnabot and Si Bun Rueang. There are a further eight tambon administrative organizations (TAO).

References

External links
https://web.archive.org/web/20070929041757/http://www.chonnabotdoc.com/ (Thai)
amphoe.com

Chonnabot